Freeform may refer to:


Computers
Freeform surface modelling, via computer-aided design (CAD)
Freeform solid modeling, via computer-aided design (CAD)
Freeform machine, 3D printing
 Freeform, a collaborative application developed by Apple Inc.

Entertainment
Freeform composition
Freeform (TV channel), an American cable television channel
Free-form radio, in which the disc jockey is given total control over what music to play
Freeform Five, UK electro-house band
Freeform jazz, free jazz, subgenre where artists improvise without any preset form or rhythm
Freeform Portland, a Portland listener-supported radio station
Freeform role-playing game, a type of role-playing game with minimal or no rules
Freeform, Electronic music genre

Other uses
Freeform crochet and knitting, done without patterns

See also
Free form (disambiguation)